E. Ponnuswamy (born 1 July 1936) was a member of the 14th Lok Sabha of India. He represented the Chidambaram constituency of Tamil Nadu and is a member of the Pattali Makkal Katchi (PMK) political party. He translate and wrote many books

References

Living people
Indian Tamil people
Lok Sabha members from Tamil Nadu
1936 births
India MPs 2004–2009
Union Ministers from Tamil Nadu
India MPs 1999–2004
People from Tiruvannamalai district
People from Cuddalore district
Pattali Makkal Katchi politicians